Venise T. Berry is an American novelist known for her novels about contemporary African-American relationships.  With her brother S. Torriano Berry, she has also written several books on African-American cinema.

Background
Venise Torriana Berry is the oldest of three children born to Virgil and Jean Berry.  She received a BA in Journalism and an MA in Communication Studies from the University of Iowa.  From the University of Texas at Austin, she received a Ph.D. in Radio, TV and Film.

Career
An Associate Professor of Journalism and African American Studies at the University of Iowa in Iowa City, Iowa.  Berry is the author of three national bestselling novels: So Good (1996), All of Me (2000) and Colored Sugar Water (2002).  She is co-author with S. Torriano Berry of The 50 Most Influential Black Films (Citadel, 2001) and The Historical Dictionary of African American Cinema (Scarecrow Press, 2007).

Awards and recognition
 2001: Honor Book Award, Black Caucus of the American Library Association for All of Me
 2001: Iowa Author Award, Public Library Foundation, Des Moines, Iowa
 2003: Creative Contribution to Literature Award, Zora Neale Hurston Society

See also
 Chick lit
 Women's literature
African-American Literature

References

External links

 

1956 births
Living people
African-American novelists
20th-century American novelists
American women novelists
American chick lit writers
Writers from Kansas City, Kansas
University of Iowa alumni
Moody College of Communication alumni
21st-century American novelists
20th-century American women writers
21st-century American women writers
20th-century African-American women writers
20th-century African-American writers
21st-century African-American women writers
21st-century African-American writers